Callopistes maculatus, also known as the dwarf tegu, Chilean dwarf tegu, spotted false monitor or Chilean iguana (in Spanish iguana Chilena), is a species of lizard in the family Teiidae. It is endemic to Chile.

Description

It is the largest lizard of Chile, reaching a  length. A diurnal species, it mainly preys upon insects, although it also eats other, smaller lizards, snakes and small birds and mammals.

References

 C. Michael Hogan & World Wildlife Fund. 2013. Chilean matorral. ed. M.McGinley. Encyclopedia of Earth. National Council for Science and the Environment. Washington DC

Callopistes
Reptiles of Chile
Endemic fauna of Chile
Reptiles described in 1838
Taxa named by Johann Ludwig Christian Gravenhorst
Taxonomy articles created by Polbot